The Chevrolet Indy V6 engine is a 2.2-liter, twin-turbocharged, V-6 racing engine, developed and produced by Ilmor Engineering-Chevrolet for the IndyCar Series. Chevrolet has been a highly successful IndyCar Series engine supplier since 2012, scoring 100 IndyCar wins, 35 pole positions, 7 IndyCar Series driver's titles and 7 IndyCar Series manufacturer's titles. On November 12, 2010, Chevrolet confirmed their return to the IndyCar Series 2012 season after 6-year absence.  They design, develop, and assemble the twin-turbo V6 Chevrolet IndyCar engine in partnership with Ilmor Engineering, and supply engines to A. J. Foyt Enterprises, Dreyer & Reinbold Racing, Ed Carpenter Racing, Harding Racing, Juncos Racing, Lazier Partners Racing, and Team Penske teams.

Specifications
Engine type: Chevrolet V-6 - twin-turbocharged
Capacity: 
HP rating (speedway / 1.5-mile oval / road-street course):   /  / 
Max. RPM/Rev limiter: 12,000 rpm; 12,200 rpm overtake
Weight: 248 lbs. (112.5 kg)
Oil system: Dry-sump lubrication
Turbocharger: Twin - BorgWarner EFR7163
Turbocharger boost levels (speedway / 1.5-mile oval / road-street course / push-to-pass):   /  /  / 
Camshafts: Double-overhead camshafts
Valve actuation: Finger-follower
Valve springs: Wire-type
Cylinder head: 4 valves (titanium) per cylinder
Fuel injection: Hitachi/Bosch 6x direct in-cylinder fuel. Hitachi/Bosch 6x high pressure port injectors
Fuel: Sunoco E85 (85% Ethanol, 15% racing gasoline)
Lubricants: Shell Helix Ultra or Pennzoil Ultra Platinum (Team Penske)/Peak Motor Oil (other Chevrolet-powered teams)
Block & head material: Aluminum
Crankshaft: Billet steel
Con rods: Billet steel
Pistons: Billet aluminum
Intake systems: Single plenum - carbon-fiber
Throttle systems: Electronic throttle control
Electronic control unit: McLaren Electronics - TAG-400I
Engine service life: 2,500–2,850 miles
Gearbox: Sequential gearbox, paddle-shift

Applications
Dallara IR-12

References

External links
Chevrolet on IndyCar.com website
Chevrolet Motorsport's Official Website
Chevrolet IndyCar official website on chevrolet.com

Engines by model
Chevrolet engines
IndyCar Series
V6 engines